Tocker is a surname. Notable people with the surname include:

Annie Constance Tocker (1889–1980), New Zealand librarian, Methodist deaconess, nurse and child welfare officer
Mahinārangi Tocker (1955–2008), New Zealand singer-songwriter
Mary Ann Tocker (1778–1853), was the first woman in Cornwall to be tried for Libel and was celebrated as the first woman to act as her own advocate in a British court of law
Nion Tocker (1885–1950), U.S. Olympic bobsledder